Kimberley Conrad (born Kimberley Conradt; August 6, 1962) was chosen as Playboys Playmate of the Month in January 1988 and became Playmate of the Year 1989. Conrad was Hugh Hefner's second wife and is mother to two of his four children. In 2017, at the age of 55, she duplicated her Playmate of the Year cover along with her cohorts Renee Tenison, Candace Collins, Lisa Matthews, Cathy St. George, Charlotte Kemp, and Monique St. Pierre nearly three decades on.

Life as Mrs. Hefner
Conrad's marriage to Playboy founder Hugh Hefner in July 1989 drew worldwide media attention. The comic strip Doonesbury referred to the event as the belated end of the 1970s. The Hefners had two sons together: Marston Glenn Hefner (who shares his birthday with his father: April 9, 1990) and Cooper Bradford Hefner (September 4, 1991). Conrad transformed the Playboy Mansion into a more conservative household for her children.

After nine years of marriage, Conrad and Hefner separated although remained nominally married. Hugh Hefner was quoted, "I would've been happy to divorce her when we separated, but she wanted to remain married for our boys." Conrad then moved into a house next door to the Playboy Mansion. After an 11-year separation, Hefner filed for divorce stating irreconcilable differences in September 2009 after his youngest child turned 18; the divorce was finalized in March 2010.

See also
 List of people in Playboy 1980–1989

References

External links
 
 
 

1962 births
Living people
People from Moulton, Alabama
1980s Playboy Playmates
Playboy Playmates of the Year
Hefner family